The India women's cricket team played the Sri Lanka women's cricket team in September 2018. The tour consisted of three Women's One Day Internationals (WODIs), which formed part of the 2017–20 ICC Women's Championship, and five Women's Twenty20 International (WT20I) matches. The matches were played in Galle, Katunayake and Colombo. India Women won the WODI series 2–1, and the WT20I series 4–0, after the second match finished in a no result.

Squads

WODI series

1st WODI

2nd WODI

3rd WODI

WT20I series

1st WT20I

2nd WT20I

3rd WT20I

4th WT20I

5th WT20I

References

External links
 Series home at ESPN Cricinfo

India 2018
2017–20 ICC Women's Championship
2018–19 Indian women's cricket
2018 in Sri Lankan cricket
International cricket competitions in 2018–19
Sri Lanka 2018
2018 in women's cricket